Quararibea velutina is a species of flowering plant in the family Malvaceae. It is found only in Peru.

References

velutina
Endemic flora of Peru
Vulnerable flora of South America
Taxonomy articles created by Polbot